CTPE may refer to:

 CT scan for pulmonary emboli
 Chandanattop railway station